The Singapore Airlines International Cup was a Group 1 flat horse race in Singapore which is open to thoroughbreds aged three years or older. It is run at Kranji over a distance of 2,000 metres (about 1¼ miles), and it is scheduled to take place each year in May. It has been discontinued to run from 2016 onwards.

It was established as an international event at the newly opened Kranji Racecourse in 2000. This was after the Singapore Derby had lost its international status, and was restricted to domestic horses only. The event has been sponsored by Singapore Airlines since its inception, and it attained Group 1 status in 2002.

In 2015, the Cup was discontinued.

Winners

 The 2003 running was cancelled due to the SARS outbreak in Asia.

References

 Racing Post:
 pedigreequery.com – Singapore Airlines International Cup – Kranji.
 turfclub.com – Singapore Turf Club.

Graded stakes races in Singapore
Open middle distance horse races
Recurring events established in 2000